In mathematics, more specifically in category theory, a universal property is a  property that characterizes up to an isomorphism the result of some constructions. Thus, universal properties can be used for defining some objects independently from the method chosen for constructing them. For example, the definitions of the integers from the natural numbers, of the rational numbers from the integers, of the real numbers from the rational numbers, and of polynomial rings from the field of their coefficients can all be done in terms of universal properties. In particular, the concept of universal property allows a simple proof that all constructions of real numbers are equivalent: it suffices to prove that they satisfy the same universal property. 

Technically, a universal property is defined in terms of categories and functors by mean of a universal morphism (see , below). Universal morphisms can also be thought more abstractly as initial or terminal objects of a comma category (see , below). 

Universal properties occur almost everywhere in mathematics, and the use of the concept allows the use of general properties of universal properties for easily proving some properties that would need boring verifications otherwise.

Other objects that can be defined by universal properties include: all free objects, direct products and direct sums, free groups, free lattices, Grothendieck group, completion of a metric space, completion of a ring, Dedekind–MacNeille completion, product topologies, Stone–Čech compactification, tensor products, inverse limit and direct limit, kernels and cokernels, quotient groups, quotient vector spaces, and other quotient spaces.

Motivation 

Before giving a formal definition of universal properties, we offer some motivation for studying such constructions.

 The concrete details of a given construction may be messy, but if the construction satisfies a universal property, one can forget all those details: all there is to know about the construction is already contained in the universal property. Proofs often become short and elegant if the universal property is used rather than the concrete details. For example, the tensor algebra of a vector space is slightly complicated to construct, but much easier to deal with by its universal property.
 Universal properties define objects uniquely up to a unique isomorphism. Therefore, one strategy to prove that two objects are isomorphic is to show that they satisfy the same universal property.
 Universal constructions are functorial in nature: if one can carry out the construction for every object in a category C then one obtains a functor on C. Furthermore, this functor is a right or left adjoint to the functor U used in the definition of the universal property.
 Universal properties occur everywhere in mathematics. By understanding their abstract properties, one obtains information about all these constructions and can avoid repeating the same analysis for each individual instance.

Formal definition
To understand the definition of a universal construction, it is important to look at examples. Universal constructions were not defined out of thin air, but were rather defined after mathematicians began noticing a pattern in many mathematical constructions (see Examples below). Hence, the definition may not make sense to one at first, but will become clear when one reconciles it with concrete examples.

For any morphism of the form 

We can dualize this categorical concept.

Note that in each definition, the arrows are reversed. Both definitions are necessary to describe universal constructions which appear in mathematics; but they also arise due to the inherent duality present in category theory.
In either case, we say that the pair  which behaves as above satisfies a universal property.

Connection with comma categories
Universal morphisms can be described more concisely as initial and terminal objects in a comma category (i.e. one where morphisms are seen as objects in their own right).

Then recall that the comma category  is the category where 
 Objects are pairs of the form , where  is an object in 

Then
for every object , there exists a unique morphism  such that the following diagram commutes. 

Note that the equality here simply means the diagrams are the same.

Conversely, recall that the comma category  is the category where 
Objects are pairs of the form  where  is an object in 

 
Then for every object , 
there exists a unique morphism  such that the following diagrams commute. 

.

Examples

Below are a few examples, to highlight the general idea. The reader can construct numerous other examples by consulting the articles mentioned in the introduction.

Tensor algebras

Let
 : -Alg → -Vect
be the forgetful functor which assigns to each algebra its underlying vector space.

Given any vector space  over  we can construct the tensor algebra . The tensor algebra is characterized by the fact:
This statement is an initial property of the tensor algebra since it expresses the fact that the pair , where  is the inclusion map, is a universal morphism from the vector space  to the functor .

Since this construction works for any vector space , we conclude that  is a functor from  -Vect to -Alg.  This means that  is left adjoint to the forgetful functor  (see the section below on relation to adjoint functors).

Products

A categorical product can be characterized by a universal construction. For concreteness, one may consider the Cartesian product in Set, the direct product in Grp, or the product topology in Top, where products exist.

Let  and  be objects of a category  with finite products.
 : 
 : 

To understand this characterization as a universal property, take the category  to be the product category  and define the diagonal functor
 
a morphism  from 
As a commutative diagram:

Limits and colimits

Categorical products are a particular kind of limit in category theory. One can generalize the above example to arbitrary limits and colimits.

Let  and  be categories with  a small index category and let  be the corresponding functor category. The diagonal functor

Properties

Existence and uniqueness

Defining a quantity does not guarantee its existence.
If, however, a universal morphism  does exist, then it is essentially unique. 
Specifically, it is unique up to a unique isomorphism: if  is another pair, then there exists a unique isomorphism 
 such that .
This is easily seen by substituting  in the definition of a universal morphism.

It is the pair  which is essentially unique in this fashion. The object  itself is only unique up to isomorphism.

Equivalent formulations

The definition of a universal morphism can be rephrased in a variety of ways. Then the following statements are equivalent:
  is an initial object of the comma category 
  is a representation of 

The dual statements are also equivalent:
  is a terminal object of the comma category 
  is a representation of

Relation to adjoint functors

By the universal property of universal morphisms, given any morphism  there exists a unique morphism  such that the following diagram commutes:

Indeed, all pairs of adjoint functors arise from universal constructions in this manner. Let  and  be a pair of adjoint functors with unit  and co-unit  
(see the article on adjoint functors for the definitions).
That is, for all  there exists a unique  for which the following diagrams commute.
That is, for all  there exists a unique  for which the following diagrams commute.

History 
Universal properties of various topological constructions were presented by Pierre Samuel in 1948. They were later used extensively by Bourbaki. The closely related concept of adjoint functors was introduced independently by Daniel Kan in 1958.

See also

 Free object
Natural transformation
 Adjoint functor
 Monad (category theory)
 Variety of algebras
 Cartesian closed category

Notes

References 
 Paul Cohn, Universal Algebra (1981), D.Reidel Publishing, Holland. .
 
 Borceux, F. Handbook of Categorical Algebra: vol 1 Basic category theory (1994) Cambridge University Press, (Encyclopedia of Mathematics and its Applications) 
 N. Bourbaki, Livre II : Algèbre (1970), Hermann, .
 Milies, César Polcino; Sehgal, Sudarshan K.. An introduction to group rings. Algebras and applications, Volume 1. Springer, 2002. 
 Jacobson. Basic Algebra II. Dover. 2009.

External links
 nLab, a wiki project on mathematics, physics and philosophy with emphasis on the n-categorical point of view
 André Joyal, CatLab, a wiki project dedicated to the exposition of categorical mathematics
  formal introduction to category theory.
 J. Adamek, H. Herrlich, G. Stecker, Abstract and Concrete Categories-The Joy of Cats
 Stanford Encyclopedia of Philosophy: "Category Theory"—by Jean-Pierre Marquis. Extensive bibliography.
 List of academic conferences on category theory
 Baez, John, 1996,"The Tale of n-categories." An informal introduction to higher order categories.
 WildCats is a category theory package for Mathematica. Manipulation and visualization of objects, morphisms, categories, functors, natural transformations, universal properties.
 The catsters, a YouTube channel about category theory.
 Video archive of recorded talks relevant to categories, logic and the foundations of physics.
Interactive Web page which generates examples of categorical constructions in the category of finite sets.

Category theory
Property